Sir Charles Eric Hambro  (30 September 1872 – 28 December 1947) was a British merchant banker and Conservative Party politician.

Early life
Charles Eric Hambro was born on 30 September 1872. He was the eldest son of Sir Everard Hambro, a merchant banker of Milton Abbey, Dorset and Hayes, Kent. He was educated at Eton College and Trinity College, Cambridge.

Career
He became a partner in C. J. Hambro & Son. He rose to become chairman of Hambros Bank.

In July 1900 he was selected as the Conservative candidate to contest the constituency of Wimbledon. He was elected unopposed to the House of Commons at the general election held in September 1900. He held the seat at the next general election in 1906, with a majority of 2,114 votes over his Liberal opponent, St. George Lane Fox Pitt. In April 1907 it was announced that he would be resigning from parliament "on account of additional responsibilities which have been cast upon him in connexion with his business". He formally left parliament on appointment as Steward of the Manor of Northstead on 27 April 1907. In February 1919 he was appointed a Knight Commander of the Order of the British Empire in recognition of his service at the Ministry of Information during the Great War.

Personal life
He was twice married: to Sybil Emily Smith in 1894, and following a divorce, to Estelle Elger in 1929. He had two sons and two daughters from his first marriage, including Charles Jocelyn Hambro, who later became a senior intelligence officer and a merchant banker.

Death
He died at his home in Sunninghill, Berkshire, aged 75 on 28 December 1947. He is buried at St Mary the Virgin, Bromley in London.

References

Members of the Parliament of the United Kingdom for English constituencies
1872 births
1947 deaths
Knights Commander of the Order of the British Empire
Eric
UK MPs 1900–1906
UK MPs 1906–1910
British people of Danish descent
English people of Danish descent
British people of German-Jewish descent
People educated at Eton College
Alumni of Trinity College, Cambridge
Barons of Denmark